Kangsŏ is a ward in Namp'o Special City, South P'yŏngan province, North Korea. The population is 191,356.

Administrative divisions
Kangsŏ-guyŏk is divided into 14 tong (neighbourhoods) and 6 ri (villages):

Transport
Kangsŏ-guyŏk is served by the P'yŏngnam and Taean lines of the Korean State Railway.

Landmarks
 Kangsŏ Three Tombs, National Treasure #28

See also
Subdivisions of North Korea
Geography of North Korea

References

External links
Map of Nyongbyon, in Korean

Districts of Nampo